"The Pig King" or "King Pig" (Il re porco) is an Italian literary fairy tale written by Giovanni Francesco Straparola in his The Facetious Nights of Straparola. Madame d'Aulnoy wrote a French, also literary, variant, titled Prince Marcassin.

Source  
The story Il re porco ("King Pig") occurs as the first story on the second night of Straparola's Nights.

Synopsis
A king  and a queen had no children after seven years.  One day, the queen slept in the garden, and three fairies saw her. One gave her a son and that no man could harm her; the second, that no one could offend her, and the son should have every virtue; the third, that she would be wise, but the son should be a pig until he had married three times. Soon after, the queen had a son in the form of a pig.  The king at first thought to throw the pig into the sea, but decided against it, and had him raised as a child.  He learned to talk, but wallowed in mud whenever he could.  One day, he told his mother that he wished to marry and persisted until the queen persuaded a poor woman to give her oldest daughter to him.  The girl was persuaded by her mother but resolved to kill her bridegroom their wedding night.  In the night, he stabbed her with his hooves, and she died.  He then asked to marry her sister, and she was persuaded, but she died as her sister had.  Finally, he married the third.  The third sister behaved politely to him, and returned his caresses.  Soon after their marriage, the prince revealed a secret to her:  he took off his pigskin and became a handsome young man in her bed.  Every morning, he put the skin back on, but she was glad to have a man as her husband.  Soon, she gave birth to a child, a son in human form.  But finally, the princess revealed the secret to the king and queen and told them to come to the bedchamber at night.  They did, and saw their son.  The king had the pigskin, lying to one side, torn to pieces, and then abdicated and had his son crowned.  He was known as King Pig, and lived long and happily with his queen.

Prince Marcassin
Madame d'Aulnoy greatly expanded the tale. Her tale is sometimes translated as The Wild Boar or Prince Wild Boar.

A queen who desperately wants to have a child dreams that three fairies talk about giving her a child:  one gives her a handsome, amiable, and loved son; the second gives her to see the son succeed at everything; and the third muttered something under her breath.  The king is anxious that the third fairy meant ill, but the queen is convinced her desire for a child made her dream it.

Soon after, she gives birth.  The child is not a son but a wild boar.  His father is persuaded not to drown him by his wife, who thinks the child has misfortune enough in being born a pig.  They try to raise him as a prince.  At the same place where she dreamed, the queen is told that one day the prince will look handsome to her.  Marcassin learns to speak and walk on his hind legs, and in many ways learns how to act the prince.

A woman named Ismene, the oldest of three sisters, is in love with a man named Coridon, and their marriage is agreed on.  Marcassin interferes and insists that she marry him, even when his mother tries to argue him from it, because it is beneath his rank, and princesses, being less free than other women, would marry him.  Ismene's mother, being ambitious, fully supports Marcassin.  The wedding is held, but Ismene and Coridon kill themselves before the wedding night.

Although Marcassin laments Ismene's death, he falls in love with her second sister, Zelonide.  She is persuaded to marry him as her sister was, and on the wedding day, she conspires to kill him, but she does not check her confidante, and he is the prince.  She tries to kill him without help, and he kills her.  He flees to the forest to avoid any more such events.

The mother of Ismene and Zelonide, regretting how she forced her daughters, retreats to the country with her youngest daughter, Marthesie.  There Marthesie meets Marcassin, who falls in love with her but laments to her that his having caused so much evil to her family will make it impossible.  She decides to marry him if only he will leave the forest.  He tricks her into a grotto where she cannot escape, and she decides that she will marry him after all.  When they go to bed, she finds him a man.  One day, while he is asleep, she finds his pig skin.  She wakes him, and he tells her that the third fairy had wished him to be a wild boar until he had married three times, and his third wife had found his pigskin.

Three white and three black distaffs comes into their room, and a voice says they will be happy if they guess what they are.  Marcassin guesses that the white ones are the fairies, and Marthesie, the black ones are her sisters and Coridon.  This reveals them in their true shapes, because the fairies had rescued those three from death.

Other literary versions
French author Henriette-Julie de Murat also delved in the theme of a swine suitor with her literary fairy tale Le Roy Porc, published in 1699. Scholarship acknowledges she seems to have borrowed the theme from Straparola's version. In de Murat's version, seventeen-year-old princess Ondine is the object of amourous intentions of the titular Pig King and of Pactole, a riff on the river-god Pactolus.

Analysis

Tale type 
It is grouped as Aarne-Thompson type 441 "Hans My Hedgehog", whose type tale is Grimms' fairy tale KHM 108, "Hans My Hedgehog". An opening episode to the Romanian work The Enchanted Pig also belongs in the group.

Motifs 
In "The Pig King", the mother's urging her daughters to marry the beast because of the financial benefits for the family—the queen has pointed out that the son and his bride will inherit the kingdom after she and the king die—represents a factor clearly present in arranged marriages.  This tale has been interpreted as symbolically representing an arranged marriage; the bride's revulsion to marrying a stranger being symbolized by his bestial form.

The animal husband 
Polish philologist Mark Lidzbarski noted that the pig prince usually appears in Romance language tales, while the hedgehog as the animal husband occurs in Germanic and Slavic tales. Also, according to Swedish folklorist , in type ATU 441 the animal husband may be a hedgehog, a wild boar or a porcupine.  The Grimms' notes state that in these fairy tales, "Hedgehog, porcupine, and pig are here synonymous, like Porc and Porcaril".

Italian writer Italo Calvino noted that "the folktale about the swine king is one of the most widespread in Italy". A similar opinion was given by Letterio di Francia: he concluded that in many Italian variants the prince is either transformed into a serpent or is an enchanted pig.

See also

Hans My Hedgehog
King Crin (Italian fairy tale) 
Ni no Kuni: Features a playable character, Marcassin, the Porcine Prince of Hamelin
The Donkey
The Fisher-Girl and the Crab
The Pretty Little Calf
The Frog Prince
Beauty and the Beast

References

Further reading

External links
"Pig or Prince? Monstrous Masculinity in Le Prince Marcassin"

Italian fairy tales
Works by Madame d'Aulnoy
Fictional princes
Fictional kings
Fictional pigs
Fiction about shapeshifting
Animal tales
Pigs in literature
ATU 400-459